Swami Vivekananda Yoga Anusandhana Samsthana, abbreviated S-VYASA or SVYASA, is a higher education institute deemed to be university located in Bangalore, India. The university is dedicated to the study of yoga based on the teachings of Swami Vivekananda. Dr. B R Ramakrishna is the current Vice Chancellor of the university.

NIMHANS and S-VYASA are working together on schizophrenia and neurological disorders like migraine and dementia.

S-VYASA specialises in two fields: Yoga research and Yoga therapy. The main campus Prashanti Kutiram is on Vivekananda Road, Kalluballu Post, Jigani, Anekal, Bengaluru.

Divisions
The university has 5 major divisions:

Division of Yoga – Spirituality
Division of Yoga & Life Sciences
Division of Yoga & Physical Sciences
Division of Yoga & Management Studies
Division of Yoga & Humanities

Claims of forthcoming yoga-based cures
The Union Minister of State for AYUSH, Shripad Yasso Naik claimed after visiting S-VYASA in 2016 that "many people told us they have been cured of cancer by regular practice of yoga. The institute has found a technique of yoga for the prevention and cure of cancer". Naik further claimed that it would become possible to treat diabetes the same way.

Notable alumni
 Hasmukh Adhia, former Finance Secretary for the Government of India in the Narendra Modi government.

References

Yoga organizations
Deemed universities in Karnataka
Ramakrishna Mission
Universities in Bangalore